The 2012 University of North Dakota football team represented the University of North Dakota in the 2012 NCAA Division I FCS football season. They were led by fifth-year head coach Chris Mussman and played their home games at the Alerus Center. This was their first year as a member of the Big Sky Conference.

This season North Dakota officially played without a mascot name after the decision to retire "Fighting Sioux" as the school's mascot amid controversy.

They finished the season 5–6,  in Big Sky play to finish in a three-way tie for eighth place.

Schedule

Despite also being a member of the Big Sky Conference, the game with Portland State on September 8 was considered a non conference game and had no effect on the Big Sky Standings.

Game summaries

South Dakota M&T

Portland State

@ San Diego State

@ Sacramento State

Cal Poly

@ Eastern Washington

Northern Arizona

Montana

@ Montana State

Southern Utah

@ Northern Colorado

References

North Dakota
North Dakota Fighting Hawks football seasons
North Dakota football